Ei To Jeebon is a Bengali drama film, directed by Biplob Sarkar.The music is released by Amara Muzik.

Soundtrack

References 

Bengali-language Indian films
2010s Bengali-language films
Indian drama films